Train for Durango is a 1968 Italian Spaghetti Western film directed by Mario Caiano.

Cast

References

External links

Spaghetti Western films
1968 Western (genre) films
1968 films
Films directed by Mario Caiano
Films scored by Carlo Rustichelli
Films shot in Almería
1960s Italian-language films
1960s Italian films